The 2008 Pickup Truck Racing season was the 12th Pickup Truck Racing season. Gavin Seager took the Rockingham Championship on September 28 and then sealed the overall championship at Pembrey with a double race win, taking his tally for the season to 13 victories with two races remaining. Gavin became the first driver to win the overall championship three times.

Race Calendar

Additional Race 

Following the rain-shortened race at Rockingham on 26 May (for which half points were awarded) an additional race was run on 12 July, making a three race weekend

Championship Standings 

Pickup Truck Racing (series)